The 2021–22 Ohio State Buckeyes women's ice hockey season represented Ohio State during the 2021-22 NCAA Division I women's ice hockey season. The program went undefeated in the postseason, winning the WCHA Final Face-off and the 2022 NCAA National Collegiate women's ice hockey tournament, their first National Collegiate Women's Ice Hockey Championship.

Offseason

Recruiting

Regular season

Standings

Schedule
Source:

|-
!colspan=12 style="  "| Regular Season
|-

|-
!colspan=12 style="  "| WCHA Frozen Faceoff
|-

|-
!colspan=12 style="  "| NCAA Tournament
|-

Roster

2021–22 Buckeyes

Awards and honors
Sophie Jaques, 2022 WCHA Defensive Player of the Year 
Sophie Jaques, Hockey Commissioner’s Association National Player of the Month for March 2022 
Sophie Jaques, Top 3 Finalist, Patty Kazmaier Award
Paetyn Levis, NCAA Frozen Four Most Outstanding Player
Nadine Muzerall, WCHA Coach of the Year

References

Ohio State Buckeyes
Ohio State
Ohio State
Ohio State
NCAA women's ice hockey Frozen Four seasons
Ohio State Buckeyes women's ice hockey seasons
NCAA women's ice hockey championship seasons